Kamia Yousufi (born 20 May 1996 in Mashhad, Iran) is an Afghan female sprinter. Her parents are originally from Kandahar.

Career 
She competed at the 2016 Summer Olympics in Rio de Janeiro in the women's 100 metres, where she finished in 22nd place in the preliminary round with a time of 14.02 seconds, a national record. She did not advance to round 1.

At the 2020 Summer Olympics, Yousufi and Farzad Mansouri carried Afghanistan's flag at the Opening Ceremony. Competing at the 100 metres she finished sixth in the first preliminary heat running a time of 13.29 seconds which was a new personal best and a national record.

In August 2021, as the 2021 Taliban offensive overran the country, Yousufi fled from Afghanistan to Iran.

References

External links

1996 births
Living people
Sportspeople from Mashhad
Afghan female sprinters
Olympic athletes of Afghanistan
Athletes (track and field) at the 2016 Summer Olympics
Iranian people of Afghan descent
Athletes (track and field) at the 2020 Summer Olympics
Athletes (track and field) at the 2018 Asian Games
Olympic female sprinters